Trace Lysette is an American actress whose most notable roles include Shea in the television series Transparent (2014–2019) and Tracey in the feature film Hustlers (2019). She also featured in the Netflix documentary Disclosure as herself.

Early life
Lysette was born in Lexington, Kentucky, and grew up in and around Dayton, Ohio.

In her late teens, she was a track athlete and performed as a showgirl in bars and clubs in Dayton and Columbus, Ohio. She moved to New York City after high school in search of opportunities. Lysette was estranged from her biological family and struggled financially due to her gender transition which led her to find acceptance in the underground New York ball culture scene, of which she has been a member since young adulthood. She began her actor training in New York City, studying at various acting studios in 2007. Her television debut was a guest appearance as Lila in an episode of Law & Order: Special Victims Unit in 2013, making her one of the first trans people to appear in a cisgender speaking role on primetime television in the US.

Career
After working in non-transgender roles, Lysette came out publicly as trans through her role as Shea on the Amazon series Transparent, which debuted in 2014. On the show, she plays a transgender yoga teacher and friend of Maura Pfefferman (Jeffrey Tambor). Lysette originally auditioned for the role of Davina. The third season of Transparent contains a storyline in which Shea has a romantic relationship with a cisgender heterosexual man, which has been called "a groundbreaking TV moment for a trans character." Lysette was an unpaid consultant for the 2015 film The Danish Girl.

Lysette made her major feature debut in 2019 starring alongside Jennifer Lopez and Constance Wu among others in the critically acclaimed box office hit Hustlers. Lysette’s role in Hustlers is one of the first times a trans actor has starred in a major US movie (not indie) alongside A-list celebrities and is arguably the first time that an out trans actor has starred in a feature film by a major studio where the character was not specifically defined as trans in the film.

She has also appeared in guest roles in shows such as Blunt Talk, David Makes Man, Midnight, Texas, Pose and Drunk History. She also made an appearance in Caitlyn Jenner's documentary series I Am Cait. Additionally, she has appeared as a muse in several high-profile music videos for artists such as Maroon 5, Cher, Teyana Taylor, The Shins, and Laverne Cox.

In 2017, transgender actors and actresses including Lysette (with the help of GLAAD and ScreenCrush) were part of a filmed letter to Hollywood written by Jen Richards, asking for more and improved roles for transgender people.

In June 2020, in honor of the 50th anniversary of the first LGBTQ Pride parade, Queerty named her among the fifty heroes "leading the nation toward equality, acceptance, and dignity for all people". An article published in July 2020 by Variety revealed that Lysette had signed on as an Executive Producer of Trans in Trumpland, a forthcoming documentary series about being transgender in the Trump Administration era.

In 2021, Lysette released her first single, "SMB", which she described as a hip hop track. She also featured on Cazwell's single, “Taser in My Telfar Bag,” with Chanel Jole. She hosted Harsh Reality: The Story of Miriam Rivera, a podcast re-examining the 2004 dating show, There's Something About Miriam. The first episode of the eight episode series was released on iTunes on November 29, 2021.

Personal life 
Lysette has spoken at various events and colleges across the country, including Women’s March Las Vegas, and Out & Equal in Philadelphia, about her experiences in hopes of highlighting the injustices that members of the trans community face. In 2017, she recorded an online PSA with Trevor Project dedicated to suicide prevention awareness for LGBTQ youth.

In 2018, Lysette commented on Twitter about actress Scarlett Johansson’s decision to accept the role of a transgender man Dante "Tex" Gill in crime drama Rub & Tug, stating that opportunities for trans actors were already so limited. Johansson eventually withdrew from the role.

Although Lysette was estranged from her family for a period of time when she transitioned, her mother later became supportive. She has stated publicly that her mother has since “come full circle“, fully accepts her now, and “is her biggest cheerleader.”

Sexual harassment 
In 2017, Lysette claimed that she had experienced sexual harassment from her Transparent co-star Jeffrey Tambor, a week after Tambor's former assistant Van Barnes made similar allegations. Two more women, Rain Valdez and Tamara Delbridge would also follow with more allegations. In response, Tambor issued a statement denying the allegations of all the women. Showrunner Joey Soloway published a statement expressing "great respect and admiration for Van Barnes and Trace Lysette, whose courage in speaking out about their experience on Transparent is an example of the leadership this moment in our culture requires." In 2018, after an extensive internal investigation by Amazon, the show's producers confirmed that Tambor would not be returning to the show.

Filmography

Film

Television

Web

Music videos

As lead artist

Guest appearances

References

External links
 

Living people
Transgender actresses
LGBT people from Ohio
21st-century American actresses
Actresses from Dayton, Ohio
Actresses from Columbus, Ohio
American television actresses
American LGBT actors
LGBT people from Kentucky
Actors from Lexington, Kentucky
Year of birth missing (living people)
LGBT rappers